The Spui is a small tidal river in South Holland in the Netherlands, connecting the river Oude Maas and the Haringvliet estuary, separating the islands of Voorne-Putten and Hoeksche Waard. Historically, it forked off the Oude Maas at the town of Oud-Beijerland to end in the Haringvliet, but as a (planned) result from the Delta Works, its flow has been reversed.

There are no bridges or tunnels crossing the Spui, but there is a car ferry from Hekelingen (municipality Nissewaard) to Nieuw-Beijerland (municipality Hoeksche Waard), and a pedestrian and bicycle ferry between Oud-Beijerland and Rhoon (in Albrandswaard).

References

Rivers of the Rhine–Meuse–Scheldt delta
Rivers of the Netherlands
Rivers of South Holland
Hoeksche Waard
Voorne-Putten